Gustavo Dourado (born 1960, Ibititá, Bahia) is a Brazilian teacher, writer and poet. Counselor of the Writers' Union of PD and author of 13 books.

He participated and coordinated the Book Fair and the Brasília Film Festival of Brasília. He was invited by the president of Brazil to write a string in honor of Ariano Suassuna. He is also director of the Academy of Arts of Taguatinga.

Main Works 
Machado de Assis – 2007
Twine of Revelation- 2004
Of Cordell Festivities- 2004
Hunger- 2002
Armageddon- 1977
Film – 2006
Cordell of Big Brother, The Beasts of the BBB- 2006

References

External links 
 Official Site
 Ebooks''''

20th-century Brazilian poets
Brazilian male poets
Living people
1960 births
20th-century Brazilian male writers